Varsha Bungalow is the official residence of the Chief Minister of Maharashtra. It is situated in Malabar Hills, Mumbai. 

The 12,000 sq ft bungalow has a complex with an office for the CM, a waiting hall and a meeting area, a pantry to cater to the visitors and other amenities.

It is protected by the special protection team of the Maharashtra Police trained specially in the academy.

See also
 List of official residences of India

References

Chief ministers' official residences in India
Government buildings in Mumbai